The Forcible Entry Act 1588 (31 Eliz 1 c 11) was an Act of the Parliament of the Kingdom of England.

Its purpose was to prevent the avoidance of the proviso to the Forcible Entry Act 1429. It provided that no restitution was to be made on an indictment for forcible entry against parties who had been in possession of the land for three years or more. It further provided that the fact of three or more years possession could be alleged in stay of restitution, on penalty of payment of costs if that fact was not proved.

See also
Forcible Entry Act

References 
Halsbury's Statutes, Third Edition, volume 18, page 411
The Statutes, Third Revised Edition, HMSO, 1950

Acts of the Parliament of England (1485–1603)
1588 in England
1588 in law